Patrik Hidi (born 27 November 1990) is a Hungarian footballer who plays as a central midfielder for Vasas in the Nemzeti Bajnokság I.

Club career
On 5 July 2022, Hidi signed a three-year contract with Vasas.

Honours
Honvéd
Magyar Kupa: 2008–09
Szuperkupa: 2009

Club statistics

Updated to games played as of 15 May 2022.

References

External links
Patrik Hidi profile at HLSZ 

1990 births
Sportspeople from Győr
Living people
Hungarian footballers
Hungary youth international footballers
Hungary under-21 international footballers
Association football midfielders
Budapest Honvéd FC players
Real Oviedo players
FC Irtysh Pavlodar players
Vasas SC players
Nemzeti Bajnokság I players
Nemzeti Bajnokság II players
Segunda División players
Kazakhstan Premier League players
Hungarian expatriate footballers
Hungarian expatriate sportspeople in Spain
Expatriate footballers in Spain
Hungarian expatriate sportspeople in Kazakhstan
Expatriate footballers in Kazakhstan